Litobrenthia stephanephora is a moth in the family Choreutidae. It was described by Alexey Diakonoff in 1979. It is found in Taiwan.

References

Natural History Museum Lepidoptera generic names catalog

Choreutidae
Moths described in 1979